The 39th Ryder Cup was held September 28–30, 2012, in the United States at the Medinah Country Club in Medinah, Illinois, a suburb northwest of Chicago. This was the first time that the Ryder Cup was held in Illinois. Europe went into the competition as the cup holders, having won in 2010 to regain it. The team captains were Davis Love III for the U.S. and José María Olazábal for Europe.

At the start of the final day's play, the U.S. led 10–6 and required 4 points to win; Europe required 8 points to retain the cup and 8 to win it outright. Europe achieved one of the greatest comebacks in Ryder Cup history by winning eight and tying one of the 12 singles matches. Martin Kaymer's five-foot putt on the 18th hole to defeat Steve Stricker took the score to 14–13, allowing Europe to retain the cup with one match still in progress. Tiger Woods missed a putt on the final green and conceded the hole to Francesco Molinari, halving the final point and securing outright victory for the European team, 14–13. It was  named by European media covering the event as the "Miracle at Medinah", and is widely regarded as one of the best sporting comebacks of all time and the greatest in Ryder Cup history.

The victory was Europe's second consecutive and fifth in the last six contests. European captain Olazábal dedicated the victory to his countryman Seve Ballesteros. The five-time major champion, who had scored 22 points in 37 matches and been part of four victorious European sides before captaining them to victory on home soil at Valderrama in 1997, had died of brain cancer in May 2011 at the age of 54, and in his memory, Team Europe wore navy blue and white garments – his traditional Sunday colors – on the final day. Additionally, the team's kit also bore the silhouette of Ballesteros famously celebrating his win at the 1984 Open Championship at the Old Course at St Andrews.

Format

The Ryder Cup is a match play event, with each match worth one point. The competition format was:
Day 1 (Friday) – 4 foursome (alternate shot) matches in the morning session and 4 fourball (better ball) matches in the afternoon session
Day 2 (Saturday) – 4 foursome matches in the morning session and 4 fourball matches in the afternoon session
Day 3 (Sunday) – 12 singles matches

On the first two days there were 4 foursome matches and 4 fourball matches, with the home captain choosing which were played in the morning and which in the afternoon.

With a total of 28 points available, 14 points are required to win the Cup, and 14 points are required for the defending champion to retain the Cup. All matches are played to a maximum of 18 holes.

Course

As part of its 2012 preparations, Medinah commissioned a $1.5 million greens renovation project on their Course No. 3, led by golf course architect Rees Jones. The project included a dramatic redesign of the 15th hole.

The redesigned 15th offers players with a 'risk-reward' opportunity with a driveable par-four by reducing its length by 100 yards and adding a two-acre lake that borders the right side of the fairway and green. The forward tee allows the hole to be set up as short as 280 yards. The original tee area of 392 yards from the championship tees will be preserved to provide the club with flexibility in course set-up.

Jones, who has overseen all architectural design aspects of Medinah's three golf courses since 2000, moved the 15th green to the left (south), which made way for the creation of a new back tee for the 16th hole. The tree-lined par-four now measures 15 yards longer – playing approximately 470 yards from the championship tees.

The major greens renovation took place on eleven of Course No. 3's original 18 greens and its main putting green, which was rebuilt to USGA specifications. Course No. 3's other six greens were re-grassed and the 15th green rebuilt.

Medinah's Course No. 3 has hosted multiple major championships. The U.S. Open has been held at the course three times: 1949 (won by Cary Middlecoff), 1975 (Lou Graham), and 1990 (Hale Irwin). Tiger Woods has won both PGA Championships held at the course (1999 and 2006). Gary Player won the U.S. Senior Open in 1988.

Before the 2012 Ryder Cup, Europe players Lee Westwood and Sergio García criticised the course, particularly for its lack of rough, trees and other hazards. García said: "There's not a lot of thinking when you get on the tee. You can pretty much hit it nice and hard and, even if you miss, pretty much every time you'll have a shot."

Television
All matches were covered live in the United States. ESPN handled Friday coverage. Mike Tirico and Paul Azinger hosted from the 18th tower, with Curtis Strange and Sean McDonough calling holes, and on-course reporters Andy North and Billy Kratzert. Scott Van Pelt hosted recaps during coverage. On Saturday, Golf Channel covered the first half-hour of the morning matches with Kelly Tilghman, Brandel Chamblee and Nick Faldo.  NBC covered the remainder of the weekend action, with Dan Hicks and Johnny Miller hosting from the 18th tower, Gary Koch and Peter Jacobsen calling holes, and on-course reporters Mark Rolfing, Roger Maltbie, and Dottie Pepper.  To bring a European perspective to the telecasts, former European Ryder Cup player Colin Montgomerie was utilized as a guest analyst by NBC on Saturday. NBC had previously used guest analysts for the Ryder Cup in 1999, 2002, and 2006

The matches were covered live in Europe by Sky Sports, with the BBC screening highlights later.

Team qualification and selection

United States
The United States qualification rules remained the same as for 2010 and the team consisted of:

 The leading eight players on the Ryder Cup Points List
Points were gained from money earned in majors in 2011 and official PGA Tour events in 2012 through the PGA Championship on August 12. One point is awarded for every $1,000 earned. Money earned in 2012 majors count double and money earned in 2012 alternate events (those played opposite the majors or World Golf Championships) count half.
 Four captain's picks
Announced on September 4, the four captain's picks were Jim Furyk, Steve Stricker, Dustin Johnson and Brandt Snedeker.

The leading players on the US Ryder Cup points list were:

Players in the qualifying places (Q) are shown in green. Captains picks (P) are shown in yellow.

Europe
The European team qualification rules changed after the 2010 contest. The European Points List took precedence over the World Points List, while the captain's picks were reduced from 3 to 2 with the top 5 players in the World Points List now qualifying rather than the top 4.
The team consisted of:
 The leading five players on the Ryder Cup European Points List
Points (1 Point = 1 Euro) earned in official European Tour events from September 1, 2011, to the conclusion of the 2012 Johnnie Walker Championship on August 26
 The leading five players, not qualified above, on the Ryder Cup World Points List
Total World Rankings Points earned in Official World Golf Ranking events from September 1, 2011, to August 20, 2012, and thereafter in the 2012 Johnnie Walker Championship only
 Two captain's picks
 The two captain's picks were announced on Monday, August 27, the day after the completion of the Johnnie Walker Championship. Olazábal chose Nicolas Colsaerts and Ian Poulter. Colsaerts became the first player from Belgium to play in the Ryder Cup.

Only members of the European Tour could earn points in the above two lists. They could be full or affiliate members and must have also satisfied (or to be planning to satisfy) their membership obligations. Martin Laird did not become an affiliate member until 2012 and so his performances in 2011 were not counted. Carl Pettersson was not a member of the European Tour and was therefore not considered.

The leading players in the European Ryder Cup points lists were:

Players in qualifying places (Q) are shown in green; captain's picks (P) are shown in yellow; those in italics (q) qualified through the other points list.

Teams

Captains
The captains were Davis Love III for team USA and José María Olazábal for Europe.

Vice-captains
Each captain selected four vice-captains to assist him during the tournament.

Love named the first two USA vice-captains in June 2012 and announced the other two after the PGA Championship.

Fred Couples
Mike Hulbert
Jeff Sluman
Scott Verplank

Olazábal named three of his vice-captains on August 16. The fourth vice-captain was announced on August 25.

Thomas Bjørn
Darren Clarke
Paul McGinley
Miguel Ángel Jiménez

Players

Captains picks are shown in yellow; the world rankings and records are at the start of the 2012 Ryder Cup.

Captains picks are shown in yellow; the world rankings and records are at the start of the 2012 Ryder Cup.

Friday's matches

Morning foursomes

Afternoon four-ball
Match 3 (Rose/Kaymer v. D. Johnson/Kuchar) started after Match 4 (Westwood/Colsaerts v. Woods/Stricker). The table below reflects the official order.

Saturday's matches

Morning foursomes

Afternoon four-ball
Match 1 (Colsaerts/Lawrie v. D. Johnson/Kuchar) started after Match 2 (Rose/Molinari v. Watson/Simpson). The table below reflects the official order.

Sunday's singles matches

Individual player records
Each entry refers to the win–loss–half record of the player.

Source:

United States

Europe

Media reaction

In the United States, The Wall Street Journal asked how could "an extremely talented American Ryder Cup team blow a final-day lead as large as any ever blown in 85 years of Ryder Cup history", while Chicago Tribune sportswriter David Haugh described the defeat as "inexcusable" having led 10–4 at one point on Saturday afternoon. Captain Davis Love III came under scrutiny for his player selections, and USA Today centered its criticism on Tiger Woods, calling him a player the U.S. "could not rely on" and "who at times appeared to be barely here". Some American newspapers elected not to dedicate back-page columns to the event.

The European victory was met with elation across the continent. Spain's daily sport newspaper Marca ran the headline: "This one is for you, Seve". Britain's Daily Telegraph wrote that after an unprecedented summer of sporting achievements, including the Olympic Games in London, Bradley Wiggins' victory in the Tour de France and Andy Murray's first tennis major at the US Open, the Ryder Cup was incapable of "dullness, one-sidedness, and hollow drama" despite the looming anti-climax at the start of the singles matches on the final day. In a reference to the economic crisis on the continent, The Irish Times said that German Martin Kaymer had given Europe "a massive bailout that contributed to the most unlikeliest comeback in Ryder Cup history".

References

External links

European Tour: 2012 Ryder Cup
Golf Channel: 2012 Ryder Cup
BBC Sport: 2012 Ryder Cup
ESPN: 2012 Ryder Cup

Ryder Cup
Golf in Illinois
Medinah, Illinois
Ryder Cup
Ryder Cup
Ryder Cup
Ryder Cup